Treptow-Köpenick is the ninth borough of Berlin, Germany, formed in Berlin's 2001 administrative reform by merging the former boroughs of Treptow and Köpenick.

Overview
Among Berlin's boroughs it is the largest by area with the lowest population density. The Johannisthal Air Field, Germany's first airfield, was located in Treptow-Köpenick, between Johannisthal and Adlershof.  Treptower Park, a popular place for recreation and a tourist destination, is also located in the borough.  The park features the sprawling Soviet War Memorial, a war memorial to the Soviet soldiers who fell in the Battle of Berlin in 1945.

Subdivisions

Treptow-Köpenick is divided into 15 localities:
Alt-Treptow
Plänterwald
Baumschulenweg
Johannisthal
Niederschöneweide
Altglienicke
Adlershof
Bohnsdorf
Oberschöneweide
Köpenick
Friedrichshagen
Rahnsdorf
Grünau
Müggelheim
Schmöckwitz

Politics

District council
The governing body of Treptow-Köpenick is the district council (Bezirksverordnetenversammlung). It has responsibility for passing laws and electing the city government, including the mayor. The most recent district council election was held on 26 September 2021, and the results were as follows: 

! colspan=2| Party
! Lead candidate
! Votes
! %
! +/-
! Seats
! +/-
|-
| bgcolor=| 
| align=left| Social Democratic Party (SPD)
| align=left| Oliver Igel
| 40,300
| 25.2
|  0.4
| 16
|  1
|-
| bgcolor=| 
| align=left| The Left (LINKE)
| align=left| Ines Feierabend
| 28,213
| 17.7
|  5.0
| 11
|  3
|-
| bgcolor=| 
| align=left| Alliance 90/The Greens (Grüne)
| align=left| Claudia Leistner
| 21,929
| 13.7
|  4.3
| 8
|  3
|-
| bgcolor=| 
| align=left| Christian Democratic Union (CDU)
| align=left| Bertram Wieczorek
| 21,131
| 13.2
|  0.7
| 8
|  1
|-
| bgcolor=| 
| align=left| Alternative for Germany (AfD)
| align=left| Alexander Bertram
| 19,031
| 11.9
|  8.2
| 7
|  5
|-
| bgcolor=| 
| align=left| Free Democratic Party (FDP)
| align=left| Joachim Schmidt
| 9,698
| 6.1
|  2.5
| 3
|  1
|-
| bgcolor=| 
| align=left| Tierschutzpartei
| align=left| Jennifer Schrodt
| 5,934
| 3.7
| New
| 2
| New
|-
| colspan=8 bgcolor=lightgrey|
|-
| bgcolor=| 
| align=left| Die PARTEI
| align=left| 
| 3,935
| 2.5
|  0.2
| 0
| ±0
|-
| bgcolor=| 
| align=left| Free Voters
| align=left| 
| 2,878
| 1.8
| New
| 0
| New
|-
| bgcolor=| 
| align=left| dieBasis
| align=left| 
| 2,533
| 1.6
| New
| 0
| New
|-
| 
| align=left| Treptow-Köpenick Voters' Association
| align=left| 
| 1,080
| 0.7
| New
| 0
| New
|-
| bgcolor=| 
| align=left| Klimaliste
| align=left| 
| 998
| 0.6
| New
| 0
| New
|-
| bgcolor=| 
| align=left| The Humanists
| align=left| 
| 630
| 0.4
| New
| 0
| New
|-
| bgcolor=| 
| align=left| National Democratic Party
| align=left| 
| 530
| 0.3
|  0.8
| 0
| ±0
|-
| bgcolor=| 
| align=left| Liberal Conservative Reformers
| align=left| 
| 514
| 0.3
| New
| 0
| New
|-
| bgcolor=| 
| align=left| Ecological Democratic Party
| align=left| 
| 431
| 0.3
| New
| 0
| New
|-
! colspan=3| Valid votes
! 159,765
! 99.0
! 
! 
! 
|-
! colspan=3| Invalid votes
! 1,627
! 1.0
! 
! 
! 
|-
! colspan=3| Total
! 161,392
! 100.0
! 
! 55
! ±0
|-
! colspan=3| Electorate/voter turnout
! 219,255
! 73.6
!  7.4
! 
! 
|-
| colspan=8| Source: Elections Berlin
|}

District government
The district mayor (Bezirksbürgermeister) is elected by the Bezirksverordnetenversammlung, and positions in the district government (Bezirksamt) are apportioned based on party strength. Oliver Igel of the SPD was elected mayor on 27 October 2011. Since the 2021 municipal elections, the composition of the district government is as follows:

Twin towns – sister cities

Treptow-Köpenick is twinned with:

 Albinea, Italy (1997)
 Cajamarca, Peru (1998)
 Cologne, Germany (1990)
 East Norriton Township, United States (1991)
 Izola, Slovenia (2002)
 Mokotów (Warsaw), Poland (1993)
 Mürzzuschlag, Austria (2002)
 Odernheim, Germany (1997)

 Subotica, Serbia (2002)
 Tepebaşı, Turkey (2017)
 Veszprém County, Hungary (2002)

See also

Berlin-Treptow-Köpenick (electoral district)

References

External links

Official homepage 
Official homepage of Berlin

 
Districts of Berlin